The University of Fort Lauderdale (UFTL) is a private non-denominational Christian university in Lauderhill, Florida. Founded in 1995, the school offers associate, bachelor's, master's, and doctoral degrees and has a mission statement of being a "premier Christian institution of higher learning empowering future leaders through higher educational degrees rooted in Biblical principles". UFTL co-founder Henry B. Fernandez leads the school as chancellor and CEO.

History and leadership
The University of Fort Lauderdale was founded as Plantation Christian University in 1995, by Henry and Carol Fernandez, senior pastors of The Faith Center. Henry Fernandez has led the university as its chancellor and CEO since its founding; he is the recipient of an honorary Doctor of Divinity degree from St. Thomas University, and is styled "Dr. Henry Fernandez" by UFTL. A "president" is also mentioned in the school's 2021–22 catalog, and the school's athletics website lists Fernandez as both the chancellor and the president.

Other leadership and administration
The school lists five other administrators apart from Fernandez. Dawn Piper is the university's chief academic officer, Dr. Brian Hankerson is the chief financial officer, Gregory Sidberry is the university librarian, Lenice Barnett is the registrar, and Winsome Brown is the  bursar. The school has both a faculty and student senate; the faculty senate president is Dr. Veronica Carter.

Academics
The university contains three colleges - a College of Business Leadership, a College of Religious Studies, and a College of Liberal Studies. The application fee is US$35 and completion of an entrance exam is accepted in lieu of submission of SAT or ACT scores.

College of Business Leadership
The College of Business Leadership offers students the opportunity to "learn and apply real-world market concepts to help ensure their success in the 21st century marketplace." The college offers an Associate of Arts in business administration, a Bachelor of Arts in business administration, with eight possible concentrations (accounting, business administration, construction management, criminal justice, healthcare administration, human resource management, management, and marketing), and a Master of Business Administration degree.

College of Religious Studies
The College of Religious Studies offers coursework that allows students to pursue ministry and pastorship. The college offers four levels of degree: an Associate of Science in ministry, a Bachelor of Science in ministry, with four possible concentrations (Christian counseling, ministry, theology, and Christian education), a Master of Divinity or Master of Science in pastoral counseling, and a Doctorate of Ministry.

College of Liberal Studies
The College of Liberal Studies, also referred to as the College of Liberal Arts by the school's website, offers "the development of broad knowledge and abilities...informed by the Christian tradition." The college offers only one degree, a Bachelor of Arts in liberal studies, with seven possible concentrations – broadcasting, English, history, information technology, psychology, religion, and theatrical production.

Campus
UFTL's campus is located in Lauderhill, Florida, and is 33,006 square feet in size. Among the university's facilities is the Henry B. Fernandez Library, which contains over 5,500 books and is a member of the Library Information Resource Network.

Campus life
The university has an enrollment of 225 students. Students are required to attend chapel once per month, as it is referred to by the school as "an integral and indispensable
part of the learning experience"; the course code MIN 180 is used for chapel, which does not provide students with credits.

Athletics

The University of Fort Lauderdale competes in the South Region of Division I of the NCCAA and fields eight teams, known as the Eagles. The athletics program is a relatively recent addition to the college, with the announcement of its establishment published on Twitter on May 11, 2020. UFTL's acceptance into the NCCAA was announced on March 25, 2021.

References

 
Transnational Association of Christian Colleges and Schools
Educational institutions established in 1995
Education in Broward County, Florida
1995 establishments in Florida
Buildings and structures in Broward County, Florida
Evangelicalism in Florida